The Inner Temple Library is a private law library in London, England, serving barristers, judges, and students on the Bar Professional Training Course. Its parent body is the Honourable Society of the Inner Temple, one of the four Inns of Court.

Its law collections cover the legal systems of the British Isles (England and Wales, Scotland, Northern Ireland, the Republic of Ireland, the Channel Islands and the Isle of Man) and also Commonwealth countries. There are, in addition, extensive non-law collections covering such subjects as history, topography, biography and heraldry, and an important collection of legal and historical manuscripts.

History

The Library is first mentioned in 1440, then in the Inn’s records in 1506.  The Library refused to accept John Selden's manuscripts in 1654, most likely because the size of the collection would have necessitated a new building, but it has been described as "the greatest loss which the Library of the Inner Temple ever sustained". In 1707 the Inner Temple was offered the Petyt Manuscripts (William Petyt had been Keeper of the Records in the Tower, and a well-known writer of constitutional law) and a sum of £150 to build a new Library, which was completed in 1709 and consisted of three rooms. A Librarian was appointed immediately, and the practice continues to this day.

The library building before World War II was a Gothic building built in 1827-8 by Sir Robert Smirke, contained about 60,000 volumes.  Modifications were made in 1867, 1872, and 1882 which extended the Library to eight rooms  In 1886, J.E.L. Pickering, Librarian, read a paper at the Library Association monthly meeting on a 5-month trial at the Library, entitled "The Electric Light as Applied to the Lighting of the Inner Temple Law Library".

The building was destroyed during the Second World War: several thousand volumes of printed books (but none of the manuscripts) were lost.  The destroyed books were mostly replaced, either by gift or purchase, over the next 30 years or so.

The present building was completed in 1958 to the design of T.W. Sutcliffe, and is in the style of the eighteenth century. The library itself occupies the top two floors, with private rooms of the benchers below.

The history of the Library is discussed in some detail in the introduction to J. Conway Davies's Catalogue of Manuscripts in the Library of the Honourable Society of the Inner Temple (Oxford, 1972).

Admission
The Library is open to all members of the four Inns of Court.  The Library is not open to the public, though non-members may be admitted, upon written application to the Librarian, to consult material not available elsewhere.

References

External links

"AccessToLaw: annotated legal links maintained by Inner Temple Library"
Drysdale, William, "About the Inns of the Court; Twenty Acres in the Heart of London Given Over to Lawyers and Students. Wales and his Bitter Beer Prayers and Champagne at the Morning Service for the Lawyers and Their Friends in the Old Church of the Knights Templars," The New York Times, 11 July 1897
 Davies, James Conway, Catalogue of Manuscripts in the Library of the Honourable Society of the Inner Temple: The Petyt Collection: MSS. 534–538. The Barrington Collection: MSS. 2–85. Records of the Inner Temple: MSS. 1–10; Volume 2 of Catalogue of Manuscripts in the Library of the Honourable Society of the Inner Temple, Inner Temple (London, England), Oxford University Press for the Masters of the Bench of the Inner Temple, 1972

Law libraries in the United Kingdom
Libraries in the City of London
Private libraries in the United Kingdom
Library buildings completed in 1958